Cayubaba (Cayuvava, Cayuwaba, Kayuvava) is a moribund language of the Bolivian Amazon. The Cayubaba people inhabit the Beni region to the west of the Mamoré River, North of the Santa Ana Yacuma, with a population of 794 inhabitants.

Since the declaration of the Supreme Decree N.º 25894 on September 11, 2000, Cayubaba has been one of the official indigenous languages of Bolivia, which was included in the Political Constitution, which was introduced on February 7, 2009.

Current situation 
As shown by Crevels and Muysken (2012), the territory of Cayubaba forms part of a region historically known as Mojos (or Moxos), that covers approximately 200,000 square kilometers of what is currently the Department of Beni. Above all, the Cayubaba focus on traditional farming, growing rice, yucca, corn, bananas, sugar cane, beans, pumpkins, sweet potatoes, etc. They also raised livestock, although on a small scale. The Cayubaba community meets at the Subcentral Indígena Cayubaba, which is affiliated to the Indigenous Peoples Center of Beni (CPIB) and is, therefore, a member of the Confederation of Indigenous Peoples of Eastern Bolivia (CIDOB).

Historical Aspects 
The first to establish contact with the Cayubaba was the Jesuit missionary priest, P. Agustín Zapata in 1693. As Crevels and Muysken (2012) point out, it was during this first visit to Cayubaba territory that Father Zapata saw seven villages, of which six had approximately 1,800 inhabitants and one had more than 2,000. At the beginning of the 18th century, P. Antonio Garriga funded the Mission of Exaltation of the Holy Cross, which was primarily inhabited by the Cayubaba. Later the Missions of San Carlos, Conception, and Peñas were founded.

At the beginning of the 19th century, when Swedish geologist and paleontologist Erland Nordenskiold visited Cayubaba, there were only 100 people from the group, who apart from their language, kept very little of their native culture. The Cayubaba region was famous for growing tobacco. At the time of the exploitation of rubber, the commercialization of tobacco was intense throughout the country, and Exaltación became a busy port on the Mamoré River. In the mid- 20th century, however, the cultivation of tobacco was almost stopped by the mass emigration of Cayubaba to Exaltación, who were fleeing the measles epidemic that almost decimated the population.

Genetic Classification 
As indicated by Crevels and Muysken (2012), despite all the tentative proposals to genetically classify Cayubaba (see, for example, Greenberg, 1987); Kaufman, 1990, 1994; Suárez, 1974), the language is still considered a language isolate.

Language Contact
Jolkesky (2016) notes that there are lexical similarities with the Arawak, Bororo, Takana, and Tupi language families due to contact.

Grammatical Sketch

Phonology 
Cayubaba presents the following system of consonantal phonemes (taken from Crevels and Muysken, 2012) based on (Key 1961), 1962, 1967). The consonant phoneme represented below with /r/ has allophones that include [ɾ~ l~ d̥].

In the second table, we are presented with the system of vowel phonemes (taken from Crevels and Muysken, 2012) and based on (Key, 1961).

Vocabulary and Word Classes 
Regarding the vocabulary and word classes in Cayubaba, the following can be pointed out (Crevels and Muysken, 2012):

 In Cayubaba, there are five distinct word classes: verbs, for example  (give),  (swim). Nouns, for example  (wind),  (monkey). Pronouns, for example  (1SG),  (2SG}, and modifiers and particles, for example  'perhaps',  (now).
 In regards to adjectives, many adjectival concepts are expressed through predicate adjectives formed with the affixes pa(+i)... +ha, for example: pa-i-ra-ha ''Well, be well', pa-tï-ha 'red, is red'. This is to say, it is difficult to establish criteria for the class of adjectives separate from verbs.
  The basic numerical system includes five numerals:   (one),  (two),  (three),  (four),  (five). These numerals can be combined with the  element 'five more' to form numbers up to ten. The numbers eleven to nineteen are formed with the augmentative suffix -  (and, in addition to). Starting from one hundred, borrowed words from Castilian are used, such as  [one-one hundred] (one hundred),  [one-thousand] (a thousand).

Morphology 
Regarding the morphology of Cayubaba, the following is presented from Crevels and Muysken:

 Regarding the nominal morphology, Cayuvava shows a process of full reduplication, for example  wïrï-wïrï 'iguana', and partial, for example uku-ku 'pig'. In addition, there are also six complex and productive processes of nominal composition:

See also
Llanos de Moxos (archaeology)

Further reading
Key, H. (1975). Lexicon-dictionary of Cayuvava-English. (Language Data Amerindian Series, 5). Dallas: Summer Institute of Linguistics.

References

External links
 Lenguas de Bolivia (online edition)
 Cayuvava (Intercontinental Dictionary Series)

Languages of Bolivia
Language isolates of South America
Endangered indigenous languages of the Americas
Mamoré–Guaporé linguistic area